Three Inches of Blood is a demo EP released by the Unicorns. The EP was allegedly burned onto 3-inch CD-Rs and given to venue owners in the Campbell River, British Columbia area who would arrange shows for the band.

Track listing

Personnel
Nicholas Thorburn (Nick "Neil" Diamonds) - vocals, keyboards, drum kit
Alden Penner (Alden Ginger) - vocals, guitars, bass, drum kit

References

The Unicorns albums
2002 albums
Self-released albums